891 Field Regiment is part of the Regiment of Artillery of the Indian Army.

Formation and history
The regiment was raised as 89 Light Regiment (Pack) on 15 April 1964 at Aurangabad with Ahir troops. It was later designated 891 Field Regiment and has also briefly served as a medium regiment.

Equipment
The regiment has been equipped with the following guns- 
120 mm mortar
130 mm medium guns
Light field gun

Operations
The regiment has taken part in the following operations –
Indo-Pakistani War of 1971 
Operation Blue Star, 1984
Operation Meghdoot, 1986
Operation Trident, 1987
Operation Rakshak, 1990
Operation Parakram, 2002
Operation Deevar, 2004
Operation Rakshak, 2006

War Cry
The war cry of the regiment is बोल श्री कृष्ण भगवान की जय (Bol Shree Krishna Bhagwan Ki Jai), which translates to Victory to Lord Krishna.

Gallantry awards
The regiment has won the following gallantry awards – 

Sena Medal (SM) – 3 (Lance Naik Devendra Singh)
Chief of Army Staff Commendation cards – 5
Vice Chief of Army Staff Commendation cards – 3 (Colonel Saurabh K Sharma, Subedar Major Chandeshwar Prasad Singh, Major Ravi Prakash Pandey.)
General Officer Commanding-in-chief Commendation cards – 7

Other achievements
The regiment was awarded the General Officer Commanding in Chief (Northern Command) unit citation in 2014.

See also
List of artillery regiments of Indian Army

References

Military units and formations established in 1964
Artillery regiments of the Indian Army after 1947